Le Sentier is a village in the Vallée de Joux  in the Canton of Vaud, Switzerland. Part of the municipality Le Chenit, the village has 3,000 inhabitants.

Numerous Swiss watchmakers are based in Le Sentier: Jaeger-LeCoultre, Gérald Genta, Patek Philippe, Vacheron Constantin, Romain Gauthier.

External links 
Flag of Le Sentier - on Flags of the World Web site

Villages in the canton of Vaud
Villages in Switzerland